Hutton is a civil parish in the Eden District, Cumbria, England. It contains 13 listed buildings that are recorded in the National Heritage List for England. Of these, one is listed at Grade I, the highest of the three grades, and the others are at Grade II, the lowest grade.  The parish contains the villages of Hutton and Penruddock and the surrounding countryside.  The most important building in the parish is Hutton John, originally a fortified tower house and later a country house; this and associated structures are listed.  Apart from a church, all the other listed buildings are houses, farmhouses and farm buildings.


Key

Buildings

References

Citations

Sources

Lists of listed buildings in Cumbria
Listed buildings